The Dallara GP2/11 is a racing car developed by Italian manufacturer Dallara for use in the  GP2 Series, a feeder series for Formula One. The GP2/11 is the overall third generation of car used by the GP2 Series and first generation of car used by the FIA Formula 2 Championship, and was introduced at the Yas Marina round of the 2011 season, replacing the Dallara GP2/08, which was also developed by Dallara. The GP2/11 was scheduled to be used until the end of the 2013 season, in keeping with the series' philosophy of upgrading its chassis every three years, but series organisers decided to keep it in competition for another three-year cycle in a bid to cut costs in the category. The GP2/11 was scheduled to be used until the end of the 2016 season before a next-generation car was introduced in 2017, but this was delayed again until 2018. As the GP2 Series and Formula 2 Championship are spec series, the GP2/11 was raced by every team and driver on the grid.

Design

History
Dallara began development, design and construction of the GP2/11 chassis in late 2009. The first chassis was assembled in July 2010, with the first chassis completed on 9 September 2010. The Dallara GP2/11 chassis replaced the Dallara GP2/08 chassis in the 2011 season.

The chassis was used throughout the rest of the GP2 Series from 2011 to 2016, and for the inaugural revived 2017 FIA Formula 2 Championship.

This chassis was generally not well received as previous chassis packages due to its appearance and the fact that overtaking was much harder compared to previous cars. To combat this, DRS was introduced in the 2015 season.

Another criticism of this car was that they favoured drivers who had experience at GP2/F2 level for multiple years. As a result of this, only once since the GP2/11 was introduced has a rookie won the GP2 / Formula 2 Drivers' Championship. No rookie managed to win the title, between 2011 and 2017.

After the 2017 Abu Dhabi rounds and Abu Dhabi post-season testing of the FIA Formula 2 Championship, the chassis together with engines were permanently retired from competition and replaced with the Dallara F2 2018 chassis starting from the 2018 season.

Engine package
The engine still carried over the same 4.0 litre (244 cu in) naturally-aspirated V8 engine developed by Mecachrome but the exhaust systems were altered by merging two exits together on the rear side.

Tyres
Pirelli would become the preferred official tyre partner and supplier of GP2 Asia Series, GP2 Series and later FIA Formula 2 Championship from 2011 until 2017 seasons. The tyre sizes and layouts were the same as Formula 1 2011-2016 designs and thus kept the traditional 13-inch wheel rims.

References

External links
FIA Formula 2 Championship official website
FIA Formula 2 The Car & Engine Guide 
FIA Formula 2 on dallara.it

GP2 Series
FIA Formula 2 Championship
Open wheel racing cars
GP2 11